Kingston Center is an unincorporated community in Delaware County, in the U.S. state of Ohio.

History
A post office called Kingston Centre was established in 1851, the name was changed to Kingston Center in 1892 and the post office closed in 1901.

References

Unincorporated communities in Delaware County, Ohio
Unincorporated communities in Ohio